OIPC may refer to:

 Office of Indigenous Policy Coordination, in Australia
 Office of the Information and Privacy Commissioner, in Canadian privacy law